Weill Cornell Medicine-Qatar (WCM-Q) is a branch of Weill Cornell Medicine of Cornell University, established on April 9, 2001 following an agreement between Cornell University and the Qatar Foundation for Education, Science and Community Development. It is located in Education City, Qatar, near the capital of Doha.

WCM-Q has 318 students, 21 preliminary students, 97 pre-medical students, and 200 in its MD program.

Profile

The school offers a six-year medical program with a single admissions. Students who complete undergraduate degrees elsewhere are able to apply to a four-year program. All students are awarded a Doctor of Medicine from Cornell University. When the school's pre-medical program opened in the fall of 2002, and was reportedly the first coeducational institute of higher education in Qatar. Its clinical affiliates are the Hamad Medical Corporation's General Hospital and Women's Hospital.

According to The Washington Post, Weill Cornell–Qatar receives $121.7 million just to cover the operating expenses for the university, making it the most expensive U.S. university in Qatar's Education City.

WCM-Q has 33 clubs, sports teams, and student organizations, some of which participate against other university campuses in Education City.

Criticism
American universities with campuses in Education City, which include Texas A&M, Carnegie Mellon, Georgetown, and Northwestern alongside Cornell, have been criticized that they possibly cannot uphold the same levels of academic freedom in Qatar that exist the United States. In response, Cornell has said that its presence in Qatar "is the best way to promote understanding" and that their collaborations across the globe fulfill its mission of "teaching, discovery and engagement."

A 2017 opinion piece in Cornell's student newspaper, The Cornell Daily Sun, called on Cornell's incoming president Martha E. Pollack to be more transparent about the relationship between the University and the Qatar Foundation, particularly in the context of the ability for Cornell employees to form a union, something that is illegal in Qatar.

See also

 Weill Cornell Medicine, the school's main campus in New York City
 Duke-NUS Medical School, an American medical school located in Singapore

References

External links
Weill Cornell Medicine-Qatar
Weill Cornell Medicine, New York
Qatar Campus
Qatar Foundation: WCM-Q
Records of the Weill Cornell Medicine-Qatar

Colleges and schools of Cornell University
Qatar Weill Medical College
American international schools
International schools in Qatar
Medical schools in Qatar
2001 establishments in Qatar
Education City
Educational institutions established in 2001
Qatar–United States relations
Satellite campuses
Universities and colleges in Qatar